Mount Skinner is a partially flat, mainly ice-free mesa, 3 nautical miles (6 km) long and 2 nautical miles (3.7 km) wide. It arises to 1,060 m immediately south of Bravo Hills, between Gough and Le Couteur Glaciers, near the edge of the Ross Ice Shelf. Surveyed by the U.S. Ross Ice Shelf Traverse Party (1957–58) under A.P. Crary, and named for Bernard W. Skinner, aviation and tractor mechanic with the Byrd Antarctic Expedition (1933–35).

Mountains of the Ross Dependency
Amundsen Coast